Archdeacon Meadow is a cricket ground in Gloucester, England.  The land is owned by The King's School.  The ground was first used by the Gloucestershire 1st XI in 1993. In 2008, the ground hosted a County Championship match against Warwickshire.

The ground has hosted 14 first-class matches and 11 List A matches.

Game Information:
{| class="wikitable"
|-
! Game Type
! No. of Games
|-
| County Championship Matches
| 13
|-
| limited-over county matches
| 11
|-
| Twenty20 matches
| 0
|}

Game Statistics: first-class:
{| class="wikitable"
|-
! Category
! Information
|-
| Highest Team Score
| Gloucestershire (695/5dec against Middlesex) in 2004
|-
| Lowest Team Score
| Gloucestershire (101 against Worcestershire) in 1993
|-
| Best Batting Performance
| Craig Spearman (341 Runs for Gloucestershire against Middlesex) in 2004
|-
| Best Bowling Performance
| Craig White (8/55 for Yorkshire against Gloucestershire) in 1998
|}

Game Statistics: one-day matches:
{| class="wikitable"
|-
! Category
! Information
|-
| Highest Team Score
| Gloucestershire (307/8 in 45 overs against Warwickshire) in 2003
|-
| Lowest Team Score
| Gloucestershire (66 in 12.2 overs against Surrey) in 1996
|-
| Best Batting Performance
| Craig Spearman (153 Runs for Gloucestershireagainst Warwickshire) in 2003
|-
| Best Bowling Performance
| Neal Radford (5/57 for Worcestershire against Gloucestershire) in 1995
|}

External links
 Cricinfo Website - Ground Page
 Cricket Archive page

Cricket grounds in Gloucestershire
Sports venues in Gloucester